Elvetham Heath is a residential area and civil parish, containing around 2000 homes on a  site, just outside the north western boundary of the town of Fleet in the English county of Hampshire. Construction of Elvetham Heath began in the summer of 1999 and ended in June 2008. The population of the civil parish at the 2011 Census was 5,183.

Location
Formerly known as Railroad Heath, it previously belonged to the local Calthorpe Estate.

The development is located precisely midway between Southampton and London.

Nature reserve
The district has a Local Nature Reserve, Elvetham Heath LNR. It is managed by Hart District Council, with the intent to move it back to typical heathland, with some marsh areas. The area supports species including slowworms, lizards, and dragonflies. Rare breed cattle graze in the nature reserve during the summer and autumn.

Proposal for Lidl supermarket and drive-through restaurant 
On 19th December 2022, the landowner of the former park & ride, located opposite the De Havilland Arms, withdrew its application to build a Lidl foodstore and drive-through following a successful campaign by local residents.

References

External links 
Official site of Elvetham Heath Parish Council
Elvetham Heath Primary School Site for Elvetham Heath's primary school
heathforum.co.uk Heath forum for residents and businesses of Elvetham Heath - smartphone and tablet friendly
Elvetham Heath Forum
On The Heath Local community website and forum for Elvetham Heath
Residents Against Lidl on Elvetham

Civil parishes in Hampshire
Local Nature Reserves in Hampshire